Myra Sajid (born as Sajid Zaki) is a Pakistani dramatist, playwright and scriptwriter. He is well known for his drama series Neeli Chatri (Blue Umbrella) about women's social issues, directed by Ahson Talish. He made his second collaboration with Talish by writing the screenplay for the serial Numm.

Personal life
Sajid Zaki was born into a Muslim family to Muhammad Zaki and Naeema Akhter in Lahore. His father was a shoe maker. He did his graduation in commerce. Afterward he realised his inner and did two year diploma in sculpture then one year diploma in multimedia and 3d animation.

In October 2009, he married Myra Asad, who encouraged his career and Sajid started writing for TV dramas with the pseudonym Myra Sajid.

Career
Sajid is a multifaceted man driven by perfection in what he sets out to do. He started his career in 2001 as an animator and editor in the TV2 Production House Lahore where he also started directing and producing music videos. In 2004 he joined Geo TV as an associate creative manager where his collaborations with Imran Aslam-president of Geo TV, Ayub Khawer, Tariq Jameel and many other senior and talented professionals polished him and boosted his career. In 2007 he left Geo TV and started working with Ahson Talish as creative director and did couple of serials, series and telefilms and many single plays. He shown his considerable mettle on private TV channels like Geo, ARY Digital, Hum TV and ATV as well. He worked on projects from music videos to documentaries switching roles as creative director, creative manager, director, producer and writer. In 2009 he rose to the challenge of giving Khuda Zameen Se Gaya Nahin the look of both a serial and a feature film.

Writing career
 Sultanat e dill, Geo TV (2014)
 Numm, serial Geo TV (2013)
 Neeli chatri Series, ARY DIGITAL(2010-2011)
 Chal Dil Mere Telefilm,  Aplus (2011) 
 Actress Telefilm,  Geo TV (2012)
 Hamaray Tumharay, serial  Urdu1 (2012)
 Aik Se Buray Do Telefilm,  Aplus (2013)

Directorial career

 Mainay Quaid Ko Dekha Hai (Short film based on 23 March Pakistan Resolution) 
nominated for Logano Film Festival
 Ki jana Main Kaun (Documentary from Geo TV)
a tribute to Bullay Shah from GEO TV
 Festival Of Light for UK
 FIA Documentary against illegal immigration.
 More than 10 episodes of Neeli Chatri Series ARY
 Many music videos

Editing career (big projects)

 Khuda Zameen Se Gaya Nahi for Hum TV and PTV (2009).... A Lux Award winner Serial 
 Many Episodes of Series Neeli Chatri for ARY Digital (2010-211)

References 

Pakistani screenwriters
Pakistani television writers
Living people
Pakistani dramatists and playwrights
20th-century Pakistani writers
21st-century Pakistani writers
1975 births